These are the rosters of all participating teams at the men's water polo tournament at the 2019 World Aquatics Championships.

Age as of the start of the tournament, 15 July 2019.

Group A

Greece
The following is the Greek roster.

Head coach: Thodoris Vlachos

Montenegro
The following is the Montenegrin roster.

Head coach: Vladimir Gojković

Serbia
The following is the Serbian roster.

Head coach: Dejan Savić

South Korea
The following is the South Korean roster.

Head coach: Go Ki-mura

Group B

Australia
The following is the Australian roster.

Head coach: Elvis Fatović

Croatia
The following is the Croatian roster.

Head coach: Ivica Tucak

Kazakhstan
The following is the Kazakh roster.

Head coach: Dejan Stanojević

United States
The following is the American roster.

Head coach: Dejan Udovičić

Group C

Hungary
The following is the Hungarian roster.

Head coach: Tamás Märcz

New Zealand
The following is the New Zealand roster.

Head coach: Davor Carevic

South Africa
The following is the South African roster.

Head coach: Paul Martin

Spain
The following is the Spanish roster.

Head coach: David Martín

Group D

Brazil
The following is the Brazilian roster.

Head coach: Rick Azavedo

Germany
The following is the German roster.

Head coach: Hagen Stamm

Italy
The following is the Italian roster.

Head coach: Alessandro Campagna

Japan
The following is the Japanese roster.

Head coach: Yoji Omoto

References

External links
Official website
Records and statistics (reports by Omega)

World Aquatics Championships water polo squads
Men's team rosters